Great King Munwon (born Wang Jeong) was a Korean Royal Prince as the 5th son of Taejo of Goryeo and Queen Sinmyeong, also the younger brother of Tae, Yo and So. He later married his half sister, had 2 sons and a daughter who would eventually become the 2nd wife of King Gyeongjong, his nephew. Although his death date was unclear, it considered that he died during the latter half of Gwangjong's reign.

Family 
Parents
Father: Taejo of Goryeo (31 January 877 – 4 July 943), personal name Wang Geon (왕건)
Mother: Queen Sinmyeongsunseong of the Chungju Yu clan
Consorts and their respective issue(e): 
Queen Munhye of the Jeongju Ryu clan (문혜왕후 류씨), his half-sister
Prince Cheonchu (천추전군), first son
Prince Aji (아지군), second son
Queen Heonui of the Chungju Yu clan ( 헌의왕후 유씨), first daughter
Son-in-law: Gyeongjong of Goryeo

In popular culture
Portrayed by Ji Soo in the 2016 SBS TV Series Moon Lovers: Scarlet Heart Ryeo.

References
Notes

Books

External links
Great King Munwon on Encykorea .
Great King Munwon on Doosan Encyclopedia .

Korean princes
Year of birth unknown
Year of death unknown
10th-century Korean people
Date of birth unknown
Date of death unknown